Eulogius (born Yuri Vasilyevich Smirnov, ; 13 January 1937 – 22 July 2020) was a Russian Orthodox prelate, at the Diocese of Vladimir between 1990 and 2018. Since 2014 Eulogius was a Doctor of Theology, and in 2006 became an Honorary Citizen of the city of Vladimir.

Early life
Smirnov was born in Kemerovo into a working-class family. His father was a plumber, while his mother was a cook. The family had seven sons and three daughters, for which their mother was awarded the honorary title "Mother Heroine".

References

1937 births
2020 deaths
Russian Eastern Orthodox priests
People from Kemerovo
Bishops of the Russian Orthodox Church
20th-century Eastern Orthodox bishops
21st-century Eastern Orthodox bishops
Deaths from the COVID-19 pandemic in Russia